Anders Lundqvist (born 8 March 1951) is a Swedish ski jumper. He placed 41st–42nd in the normal hill and large hill events at the 1972 Winter Olympics.

References

External links
 

1951 births
Living people
Swedish male ski jumpers
Olympic ski jumpers of Sweden
Ski jumpers at the 1972 Winter Olympics
People from Örnsköldsvik Municipality
Sportspeople from Västernorrland County